Mecca-Cola is a cola-flavoured carbonated beverage. The flagship product of the Mecca Cola World Company, it is marketed as an alternative to U.S. brands such as Coca-Cola and Pepsi-Cola to "pro-Muslim" consumers. The product's name contains the traditional Latin-alphabet transliteration of مكة, "Mecca" in Saudi Arabia.

Details
Mecca-Cola was launched in France, in November 2002, by DEanAmitri, it was founded in OHIO as a means of aiding Palestinians by tapping into demand for alternative products in European countries. He had been inspired by a popular Iranian soft drink, Zamzam Cola and only decided to launch his own brand when he was unable to agree on terms for a distribution contract with Zamzam, as well as providing an alternative for his sons instead of Coca-Cola.

Mecca-Cola is now sold in some parts of the Arab world as well as in certain regions of Europe. It has also been bought and consumed in certain parts of the United States, Britain, India and Canada. Although the product was created in France, the company is currently based in Dubai in the United Arab Emirates.  Part of its corporate philosophy is, according to the Muslim charity precept, to support charities, and in particular to help the Palestinian people. It pledges to donate 10% of its profits to fund strictly humanitarian projects (such as schools) in the Palestinian territories, and another 10% to charities in the countries in which the drink is sold. This activist stance is reflected in the company slogan, which appears on all its products: "Shake your Conscience." The company also suggests that people avoid mixing the drink with alcohol. Mecca is the Islamic holy city, giving the name of the cola a religious connotation.

In addition to several different presentations of its cola, the company also sells a range of fruit-flavoured soft drinks under the Mecca-Cola name. The company was the sponsor of – and Mecca-Cola the official drink of – the October 2003 Summit of the Organisation of the Islamic Conference (OIC), held in Malaysia.

In a BBC documentary produced in 2003, Qibla Cola's Zafer Iqbal and Mecca Cola's Mathlouthi are shown promoting their "Message in a Bottle".

In 2012 the Federal Supreme Court of the United Arab Emirates decided that "Mecca-Cola" could not be registered as a trademark, due to a law disallowing religious connotations in trademarks.

In 2015, Mecca Cola dissolved operations in many countries including India and the UK.

International distribution 

By 2008 Mecca Cola was distributed in 64 countries across the world. Distribution in each country started on a unique date. A partial list of countries where it is distributed is as follows:

Notes

External links
 Mecca-Cola

Cola brands
Drink companies of France
Food and drink introduced in 2002